Celtis philippensis, is an Asian species of flowering plant in the family Cannabaceae.

In culture
Known as "මැදිතෙල්ල - medithella" in Sinhala.

References

Sources
 http://www.theplantlist.org/tpl1.1/record/kew-2708529
 http://www.theplantlist.org/tpl1.1/record/kew-2708413
 http://www.biotik.org/india/species/c/celtphwi/celtphwi_en.html
 http://www.efloras.org/florataxon.aspx?flora_id=2&taxon_id=242311733

philippensis
Flora of Sri Lanka
Taxa named by Francisco Manuel Blanco